Siaka may refer to the following people:

Given name
Siaka Bagayoko (born 1998), Malian football defender
Siaka Bamba (born 1989), Ivorian football midfielder
Siaka Son (born 1980), Burkinabé sprinter 
Siaka Stevens (1905–1988), leader of Sierra Leone
Siaka Stevens (Ghanaian politician)
Siaka Tiéné (born 1982), Ivorian footballer
Siaka Touré (1935–1985), Guinean military commander

Surname
Dagno Siaka (born 1987), Ivorian footballer 
 Lega Siaka (born 1992), Papua New Guinean cricketer
Pauke Siaka (born 1986), Papua New Guinean cricketer